Japanese literature throughout most of its history has been influenced by cultural contact with neighboring Asian literatures, most notably China and its literature. Indian literature also had an influence through the spread of Buddhism in Japan.

Following the Perry Expedition which led to the end of the  policy and the forced reopening of foreign trade, Western literature has also made influences to the development of modern Japanese writers, while Japanese literature has in turn become more recognized internationally, leading to two Japanese Nobel laureates in literature, namely Yasunari Kawabata and Kenzaburō Ōe.

History

Nara-period literature (before 794)
Before the introduction of kanji from China to Japan, Japan had no writing system; it is believed that Chinese characters came to Japan at the very beginning of the 5th century, brought by immigrants from Korea and China. Early Japanese texts first followed the Chinese model, before gradually transitioning to a hybrid of Chinese characters used in Japanese syntactical formats, resulting in sentences written with Chinese characters but read phonetically in Japanese.

The earliest literary works in Japan were created in the Nara period. One of the stories they describe is the tale of Urashima Tarō.

Heian literature (794–1185)

The Heian period has been referred to as the golden era of art and literature in Japan. During this era, literature became centered on a cultural elite of nobility and monks. The imperial court particularly patronized the poets, most of whom were courtiers or ladies-in-waiting. Reflecting the aristocratic atmosphere, the poetry was elegant and sophisticated and expressed emotions in a rhetorical style. Editing the resulting anthologies of poetry soon became a national pastime. The  poem, now one of two standard orderings for the Japanese syllabary, was also developed during the early Heian period.

, written in the early 11th century by female courtier Murasaki Shikibu, is considered the pre-eminent novel of Heian fiction. The Pillow Book was written by Sei Shōnagon, Murasaki Shikibu's contemporary and rival, as an essay about the life, loves, and pastimes of nobles in the Emperor's court. The volumes cover various tales from India, China and Japan.

The 10th-century Japanese narrative, can be considered an early example of proto-science fiction. The protagonist of the story, Kaguya-hime, is a princess from the Moon who is sent to Earth for safety during a celestial war, and is found and raised by a bamboo cutter. She is later taken back to her extraterrestrial family in an illustrated depiction of a disc-shaped flying object similar to a flying saucer.

Kamakura-Muromachi period literature (1185–1603)

During the Kamakura period (1185–1333), Japan experienced many civil wars which led to the development of a warrior class, and subsequent war tales, histories, and related stories. Work from this period is notable for its more somber tone compared to the works of previous eras, with themes of life and death, simple lifestyles, and redemption through killing. Other important tales of the period include Kamo no Chōmei's  (1212) and Yoshida Kenkō's  (1331).

Despite a decline in the importance of the imperial court, aristocratic literature remained the center of Japanese culture at the beginning of the Kamakura period. Many literary works were marked by a nostalgia for the Heian period. The Kamakura period also saw a renewed vitality of poetry, with a number of anthologies compiled, such as the  compiled in the early 1200s. However, there were fewer notable works by female authors during this period, reflecting the lowered status of women.

As the importance of the imperial court continued to decline, a major feature of Muromachi literature (1333–1603) was the spread of cultural activity through all levels of society. Classical court literature, which had been the focal point of Japanese literature up until this point, gradually disappeared. The development of roads, along with a growing public interest in travel and pilgrimages, brought rise to the greater popularity of travel literature from the early 13th to 14th centuries.

Edo-period literature (1603–1868)

Literature during this time was written during the largely peaceful Tokugawa shogunate (commonly referred to as the Edo period). Due in large part to the rise of the working and middle classes in the new capital of Edo (modern Tokyo), forms of popular drama developed which would later evolve into kabuki. The  and kabuki dramatist Chikamatsu Monzaemon (1653–1725) became popular at the end of the 17th century, and he is also known as Japan's Shakespeare.

Many different genres of literature made their debut during the Edo period, helped by a rising literacy rate among the growing population of townspeople, as well as the development of lending libraries. Ihara Saikaku (1642–1693) might be said to have given birth to the modern consciousness of the novel in Japan, mixing vernacular dialogue into his humorous and cautionary tales of the pleasure quarters, the so-called  ("floating world") genre. Ihara's Life of an Amorous Man is considered the first work in this genre.

Matsuo Bashō (1644–1694) is recognized as the greatest master of haiku (then called ). His poems were influenced by his firsthand experience of the world around him, often encapsulating the feeling of a scene in a few simple elements. He made his life's work the transformation of  into a literary genre. For Bashō,  involved a combination of comic playfulness and spiritual depth, ascetic practice, and involvement in human society. In particular, Bashō wrote , a major work in the form of a travel diary, considered "one of the major texts of classical Japanese literature."

Fukuda Chiyo-ni (1703–1775) is widely regarded as one of the greatest haiku poets. Before her time, haiku by women were often dismissed and ignored. Her dedication toward her career not only paved a way for her career but it also opened a path for other women to follow. Her early poems were influenced by Matsuo Bashō, although she did later develop her own unique style as an independent figure in her own right. While still a teenager, she had already become very popular all over Japan for her poetry. Her poems, although mostly dealing with nature, work for unity of nature with humanity. Her own life was that of the  poets who made their lives and the world they lived in one with themselves, living a simple and humble life. She was able to make connections by being observant and carefully studying the unique things around her ordinary world and writing them down.

 was an intellectual movement situated in Edo and centered on the study of Dutch (and by subsequently western) science and technology, history, philosophy, art, and language, based primarily on the Dutch books imported via Nagasaki. Sugita Genpaku (1733–1817) was a Japanese scholar known for his translation of Kaitai Shinsho (New Book of Anatomy) from the Dutch-language anatomy book . As a full-blown translation from a Western language, it was the first of its kind in Japan. Although there was a minor Western influence trickling into the country from the Dutch settlement at Nagasaki, it was the importation of Chinese vernacular fiction that proved the greatest outside influence on the development of Early Modern Japanese fiction.

Jippensha Ikku (1765–1831) is known as Japan's Mark Twain and wrote , which is a mix of travelogue and comedy.

Kyokutei Bakin (1767–1848) wrote the extremely popular fantasy/historical romance  over a period of twenty-eight years to complete (1814–1842), in addition to other . Santō Kyōden wrote  mostly set in the red-light districts until the Kansei edicts banned such works, and he turned to comedic . Genres included horror, crime stories, morality stories, comedy, and pornography — often accompanied by colorful woodcut prints.

Hokusai (1760–1849), perhaps Japan's most famous woodblock print artist, also illustrated fiction as well as his famous 36 Views of Mount Fuji.

Nevertheless, in the Tokugawa period, as in earlier periods, scholarly work continued to be published in Chinese, which was the language of the learned much as Latin was in Europe.

Meiji, Taishō, and early Shōwa-period literature (1868–1945)

The Meiji period marked the re-opening of Japan to the West, ending over two centuries of national seclusion, and marking the beginning of a period of rapid industrialization. The introduction of European literature brought free verse into the poetic repertoire. It became widely used for longer works embodying new intellectual themes. Young Japanese prose writers and dramatists faced a suddenly-broadened horizon of new ideas and artistic schools, with novelists amongst some of the first to assimilate these concepts successfully into their writing.

Natsume, Mori Ōgai, and Shiga Naoya, who was called "god of the novel" as the most prominent "I novel" writer, were instrumental in adopting and adapting Western literary conventions and techniques. Ryūnosuke Akutagawa is known especially for his historical short stories. Ozaki Kōyō, Kyōka Izumi, and Ichiyo Higuchi represent a strain of writers whose style hearkens back to early-Modern Japanese literature.

In the early Meiji period (1868–1880s), Fukuzawa Yukichi authored Enlightenment literature, while pre-modern popular books depicted the quickly changing country. Realism was brought in by Tsubouchi Shōyō and Futabatei Shimei in the mid-Meiji period (late 1880s–early 1890s) while the Classicism of Ozaki Kōyō, Yamada Bimyo and Kōda Rohan gained popularity. Ichiyō Higuchi, a rare female writer in this era, wrote short stories on powerless women of this age in a simple style in between literary and colloquial. Kyōka Izumi, a favored disciple of Ozaki, pursued a flowing and elegant style and wrote early novels such as The Operating Room (1895) in literary style and later ones including The Holy Man of Mount  (1900) in colloquial language.

Mori also wrote some modern novels including The Dancing Girl (1890), The Wild Geese (1911), then later wrote historical novels. He eventually pursued transcendence of human emotions and egoism in his later works including  (1914) and his last and unfinished novel Light and darkness (1916).

Shimazaki shifted from Romanticism to Naturalism which was established with his The Broken Commandment (1906) and Katai Tayama's Futon (1907). Naturalism hatched "I Novel" that describes the authors themselves and depicts their own mental states. Neo-romanticism came out of anti-naturalism and was led by Kafū Nagai, Jun'ichirō Tanizaki, Kōtarō Takamura, Hakushū Kitahara and others in the early 1910s. Saneatsu Mushanokōji, Naoya Shiga and others founded a magazine  in 1910. They shared a common characteristic, Humanism. Shiga's style was autobiographical and depicted states of his mind and sometimes classified as "I Novel" in this sense. Ryūnosuke Akutagawa, who was highly praised by Soseki, wrote short stories including  (1915) with an intellectual and analytic attitude and represented Neo-realism in the mid-1910s.

During the 1920s and early 1930s the proletarian literary movement, comprising such writers as Takiji Kobayashi, Denji Kuroshima, Yuriko Miyamoto and Ineko Sata produced a politically radical literature depicting the harsh lives of workers, peasants, women, and other downtrodden members of society, and their struggles for change.

Pre-war Japan saw the debut of several authors best known for the beauty of their language and their tales of love and sensuality, notably Jun'ichirō Tanizaki and Japan's first winner of the Nobel Prize for Literature, Yasunari Kawabata, a master of psychological fiction. Ashihei Hino wrote lyrical bestsellers glorifying the war, while Tatsuzō Ishikawa attempted to publish a disturbingly realistic account of the advance on Nanjing. Writers who opposed the war include Denji Kuroshima, Mitsuharu Kaneko, Hideo Oguma and Jun Ishikawa.

Postwar literature (1945–onwards)
World War II, and Japan's defeat, deeply influenced Japanese literature. Many authors wrote stories of disaffection, loss of purpose, and the coping with defeat. Haruo Umezaki's short story  shows a disillusioned and skeptical Navy officer stationed in a base located on the Sakurajima volcanic island, close to Kagoshima, on the southern tip of Kyushu. Osamu Dazai's novel The Setting Sun tells of a soldier returning from Manchukuo. Shōhei Ōoka won the Yomiuri Prize for his novel Fires on the Plain about a Japanese deserter going mad in the Philippine jungle. Nobuo Kojima's short story "The American School" portrays a group of Japanese teachers of English who, in the immediate aftermath of the war, deal with the American occupation in varying ways.

Prominent writers of the 1970s and 1980s were identified with intellectual and moral issues in their attempts to raise social and political consciousness. One of them, Kenzaburō Ōe, who published one of his best-known works, A Personal Matter in 1964, became Japan's second winner of the Nobel Prize for Literature.

Yasushi Inoue also turned to the past in masterful historical novels of Inner Asia and ancient Japan, in order to portray present human fate.

Avant-garde writers, such as Kōbō Abe, who wrote novels such as The Woman in the Dunes (1960), wanted to express the Japanese experience in modern terms without using either international styles or traditional conventions, developed new inner visions. Yoshikichi Furui related the lives of alienated urban dwellers coping with the minutiae of daily life, while the psychodramas within such daily life crises have been explored by a rising number of important women novelists. Other award-winning stories at the end of the decade dealt with current issues of the elderly in hospitals, the recent past (Pure-Hearted Shopping District in Kōenji, Tokyo), and the life of a Meiji period ukiyo-e artist.

Haruki Murakami is one of the most popular and controversial of today's Japanese authors. His genre-defying, humorous and surreal works have sparked fierce debates in Japan over whether they are true "literature" or simple pop-fiction: Kenzaburō Ōe has been one of his harshest critics. Some of Murakami's best-known works include Norwegian Wood (1987) and The Wind-Up Bird Chronicle (1994–1995).

Banana Yoshimoto, a best-selling contemporary author whose "manga-esque" style of writing sparked much controversy when she debuted in the late 1980s, has come to be recognized as a unique and talented author over the intervening years. Her writing style stresses dialogue over description, resembling the script of a manga, and her works focus on love, friendship, and loss. Her breakout work was 1988's Kitchen.

Although modern Japanese writers covered a wide variety of subjects, one particularly Japanese approach stressed their subjects' inner lives, widening the earlier novel's preoccupation with the narrator's consciousness. In Japanese fiction, plot development and action have often been of secondary interest to emotional issues. In keeping with the general trend toward reaffirming national characteristics, many old themes re-emerged, and some authors turned consciously to the past. Strikingly, Buddhist attitudes about the importance of knowing oneself and the poignant impermanence of things formed an undercurrent to sharp social criticism of this material age. There was a growing emphasis on women's roles, the Japanese persona in the modern world, and the malaise of common people lost in the complexities of urban culture.

Popular fiction, non-fiction, and children's literature all flourished in urban Japan in the 1980s. Many popular works fell between "pure literature" and pulp novels, including all sorts of historical serials, information-packed docudramas, science fiction, mysteries, detective fiction, business stories, war journals, and animal stories. Non-fiction covered everything from crime to politics. Although factual journalism predominated, many of these works were interpretive, reflecting a high degree of individualism. Children's works re-emerged in the 1950s, and the newer entrants into this field, many of the younger women, brought new vitality to it in the 1980s.

Manga — Japanese comics — have penetrated almost every sector of the popular market. They include virtually every field of human interest, such as multivolume high-school histories of Japan and, additionally for the adult market, a manga introduction to economics, and pornography (hentai). Manga represented between 20 and 30 percent of annual publications at the end of the 1980s, in sales of some ¥400 billion per year. Light novels, a Japanese type of young adult novel, often feature plots and illustrations similar to those seen in manga. Many manga are fan-made.

Literature utilizing new media began to appear at the end of the 20th century. Visual novels, a type of interactive fiction, were produced for personal computers beginning in the 1980s. Cell phone novels appeared in the early 21st century. Written by and for cell phone users, the novels — typically romances read by young women — have become very popular both online and in print. Some, such as Love Sky, have sold millions of print copies, and at the end of 2007 cell phone novels comprised four of the top five fiction best sellers.

Female authors 
Female writers in Japan enjoyed a brief period of success during the Heian period, but were undermined following the decline in power of the Imperial Court in the 14th century. Later, in the Meiji era, earlier works written by women such as Murasaki Shikibu and Sei Shonagon were championed amongst the earliest examples of the Japanese literary language, even at a time when the authors themselves experienced challenges due to their gender. One Meiji-period writer, Shimizu Shikin, sought to encourage positive comparisons between her contemporaries and their female forebears in the hopes that female authors would be viewed with respect by society, despite assuming a public role outside the traditional confines of a woman's role in her home (see Good Wife, Wise Mother). Other notable authors of the Meiji period included Hiratsuka Raicho, Higuchi Ichiyo, Tamura Toshiko, Nogami Yaeko and Yosano Akiko.

Significant authors and works

Nara-period literature
 Ōtomo no Yakamochi: possible compiler of the

Heian-period literature

 Ariwara no Narihira (825–880)
 Ono no Komachi ( – )
 Sugawara no Michizane (845–903)
 Ki no Tsurayuki (872–945)
 Lady Ise ( – )
 Minamoto no Shitagō (911–983)
 Michitsuna no Haha ( – ): author of 
 Akazome Emon ( – )
 Sei Shōnagon ( – ): The Pillow Book
 Murasaki Shikibu ( – ): The Tale of Genji
 Izumi Shikibu ( – ):
 Lady Sarashina ( – ): author of 
 Saigyō Hōshi (1118–1190)

Kamakura-Muromachi-period literature
 The Tale of the Heike (–1309)
 
 Fujiwara no Teika (1162–1241)
 Yoshida Kenkō (–1352):

Edo-period literature

 Miyamoto Musashi (–1645): The Book of Five Rings
 Ihara Saikaku (1642–1693)
 Matsuo Bashō (1644–1694)
 Chikamatsu Monzaemon (1653–1725)
 Yamamoto Tsunetomo (1659–1719)
 Yokoi Yayū (1702–1783)
 Fukuda Chiyo-ni (1703–1775)
 Yosa Buson (1716–1784)
 Motoori Norinaga (1730–1801)
 Sugita Genpaku (1733–1817)
 Ueda Akinari (1734–1809)
 Santō Kyōden (1761–1816)
 Kobayashi Issa (1763–1828)
 Jippensha Ikku (1765–1831)
 Kyokutei Bakin (1767–1848)
  (travelogue, 1834)
  (work of human geography, 1837)

Meiji- and Taisho-period literature

 Nakane Kōtei (1839–1913)
 Lafcadio Hearn (1850–1904)
 Mori Ōgai (1862–1922)
 Futabatei Shimei (1864–1909)
 Itō Sachio (1864–1913)
 Natsume Sōseki (1867–1916)
 Kōda Rohan (1867–1947)
 Masaoka Shiki (1867–1902)
 Ozaki Kōyō (1868–1903)
 Doppo Kunikida (1871–1908)
 Ichiyō Higuchi (1872–1896)
 Tōson Shimazaki (1872–1943)
 Kyōka Izumi (1873–1939)
 Yonejiro Noguchi (1875–1947)
 Takeo Arishima (1878–1923)
 Akiko Yosano (1878–1942)
 Kafū Nagai (1879–1959)
 Naoya Shiga (1883–1971)
 Takuboku Ishikawa (1886–1912)
 Kan Kikuchi (1888–1948)
 Ryūnosuke Akutagawa (1892–1927)
 Kenji Miyazawa (1896–1933)
 Denji Kuroshima (1898–1943)
 Motojirō Kajii (1901–1932)
 Hideo Oguma (1901–1940)
 Takiji Kobayashi (1903–1933)

Modern literature

 Kansuke Naka (1885–1965)
 Yaeko Nogami (1885–1985)
 Jun'ichirō Tanizaki (1886–1965)
 Hyakken Uchida (1889–1971)
 Edogawa Ranpo (1894–1965)
 Eiji Yoshikawa (1892–1962)
 Mitsuharu Kaneko (1895–1975)
 Juza Unno (1897–1949)
 Shigeji Tsuboi (1897–1975)
 Chiyo Uno (1897–1996)
 Masuji Ibuse (1898–1993)
 Jun Ishikawa (1899–1987)
 Yasunari Kawabata (1899–1972)
 Yuriko Miyamoto (1899–1951)
 Sakae Tsuboi (1899–1967)
 Fumiko Hayashi (1903–1951)
 Tamiki Hara (1905–1951)
 Tatsuzō Ishikawa (1905–1985)
 Fumiko Enchi (1905–1986)
 Ango Sakaguchi (1906–1955)
 Osamu Dazai (1909–1948)
 Shōhei Ōoka (1909–1988)
 Sakunosuke Oda (1913–1947)
 Haruo Umezaki (1915–1965)
 Ayako Miura (1922–1999)
 Shūsaku Endō (1923–1996)
 Ryōtarō Shiba (1923–1996)
 Kōbō Abe (1924–1993)
 Toyoko Yamasaki (1924–2013)
 Yukio Mishima (1925–1970)
 Osamu Tezuka (1928–1989)
 Akiyuki Nosaka (1930–2015)
 Sawako Ariyoshi (1931–1984)
 Ayako Sono (b. 1931)
 Hisashi Inoue (1933–2010)
 Kenzaburō Ōe (b. 1935)
 Michiko Yamamoto (b. 1936)
 Kenji Nakagami (1946–1992)
 Haruki Murakami (b. 1949)
 Natsuo Kirino (b. 1951)
 Ryū Murakami (b. 1952)
 Yōko Ogawa (b. 1962)
 Banana Yoshimoto (b. 1964)
 Mieko Kawakami (b. 1976)
 Sayaka Murata (b. 1979)

Awards and contests

Japan has some literary contests and awards in which authors can participate and be awarded.

The Akutagawa Prize is one of the most prestigious literary awards, and receives wide attention from media.

Notes

References

Bibliography
Aston, William George. A History of Japanese Literature, William Heinemann, 1899.
Birnbaum, A., (ed.). Monkey Brain Sushi: New Tastes in Japanese Fiction. Kodansha International (JPN).
Carol Fairbanks. Japanese Women Fiction Writers, Scarecrow Press, 2002. 
Donald Keene
Modern Japanese Literature, Grove Press, 1956. 
World Within Walls: Japanese Literature of The Pre-Modern Era 1600–1867, Columbia University Press. 1976, reprinted 1999 
Dawn to the West: Japanese Literature in the Modern Era, Poetry, Drama, Criticism, Columbia University Press. 1984, reprinted 1998 
Travellers of a Hundred Ages: The Japanese as Revealed Through 1,000 Years of Diaries, Columbia University Press. 1989, reprinted 1999 
Seeds in the Heart: Japanese Literature from the Earliest Times to the Late Sixteenth Century, Columbia University Press. 1993, reprinted 1999 
McCullough, Helen Craig, Classical Japanese prose: an anthology, Stanford, Calif. : Stanford University Press, 1990, 
Miner, Earl Roy, Odagiri, Hiroko, and Morrell, Robert E., The Princeton companion to classical Japanese literature, Princeton, N.J. : Princeton University Press, 1985. 
 Ema Tsutomu, Taniyama Shigeru, Ino Kenji,  Kyoto Shobō. 1977, revised 1981, reprinted 1982

Further reading

 Aston, William George. A history of Japanese literature, NY, 1899 online
 Karatani, Kōjin. Origins of modern Japanese literature, Duke University Press, 1993.
 Katō, Shūichi. A History of Japanese Literature: The first thousand years. Vol. 1., Tokyo; New York: Kodansha International, 1979.
 Keene, Donald. Japanese literature: An introduction for Western readers, 1953.
 Konishi, Jin'ichi. A History of Japanese Literature, Volume 3: The High Middle Ages, Princeton University Press, 2014.
 Shirna Haruo, Suzuki Tomi, Lurie, David (eds.), The Cambridge History of Japanese Literature, Cambridge, Cambridge University Press, 2016.

Primary sources
 Keene, Donald. Anthology of Japanese Literature: From the Earliest Era to the Mid-Nineteenth Century, Grove/Atlantic, Inc., 2007.

Online text libraries
Japanese Text Initiative, University of Virginia Library Electronic Text Center
Premodern Japanese Texts and Translations, Michael Watson, Meiji Gakuin University

See also

 List of Japanese writers
 List of Japanese classical texts
 Japanese poetry
 Aozora Bunko – a repository of Japanese literature
 Japanese detective fiction
 Japanese science fiction
 Light novel

External links
Japanese Literature Publishing Project, the Agency for Cultural Affairs of Japan
Japanese Book News Website , the Japan Foundation
Electronic texts of pre-modern Japanese literature by Satoko Shimazaki
List of literary awards for fiction and nonfiction.